Male cow may refer to:
Bull, intact adult male
Ox, castrated adult male
Steer, castrated male
Male cattle inaccurately depicted in popular culture as possessing udders or producing milk, such as in the film Barnyard